Hansell Argenis Riojas La Rosa (born 15 October 1991) is a Peruvian professional footballer who plays as a defender for Cienciano in the Peruvian Primera División.

International career
He made his debut for Peru in a 3–0 defeat to England at Wembley Stadium on 30 May 2014. During the game, he was hit by a paper plane thrown from the crowd, with footage of the moment subsequently going viral.

References

External links

1991 births
Living people
Sportspeople from Callao
Peruvian footballers
Peru international footballers
Peruvian expatriate footballers
Association football defenders
Sport Boys footballers
Deportivo Municipal footballers
Cienciano footballers
Club Deportivo Universidad César Vallejo footballers
Club Alianza Lima footballers
Club Atlético Belgrano footballers
Peruvian Primera División players
Argentine Primera División players
Viral videos
2015 Copa América players
Peruvian expatriate sportspeople in Argentina
Expatriate footballers in Argentina